Rage E.P. is a release by Atari Teenage Riot. Although the title of the release is "Rage E.P.", it only contains versions of the song "Rage", so it is similar to a single. The CD versions are enhanced CDs which contain the single file of the music video "Too Dead For Me" in MPEG format. A 12" vinyl edition also exists.

The song "Rage" was later released on the compilation Atari Teenage Riot: 1992-2000. The song was also released on the various artist compilations Clear And Present Danger Vol. 1 and DHR LTD12 CD.

Track listing

Personnel
Alec Empire – production, performance
Carl Crack – performance
Nic Endo – performance
Hanin Elias – performance
Tom Morello – guitar on "Rage"
MC D-Stroy – vocals on "Rage (Remix)"
Steve Rooke – mastering

References

External links
Digital Hardcore Recordings CD entry at discogs.com
Digital Hardcore Recordings 12" vinyl entry at discogs.com
Beat Records CD entry at discogs.com

Atari Teenage Riot albums
2000 EPs